Cordylus phonolithos, the N’Dolondolo girdled lizard, is a species of lizard in the family Cordylidae. It is a small, spiny lizard found in Angola.

References

Cordylus
Reptiles of Angola
Endemic fauna of Angola
Reptiles described in 2019
Taxa named by Mariana P. Marques
Taxa named by Luis M. P. Ceríaco
Taxa named by Edward L. Stanley
Taxa named by Suzana Bandeira
Taxa named by Ishan Agarwal
Taxa named by Aaron M. Bauer